Robert Louis Barry (born 1934 in Pittsburgh, Pennsylvania) is a career member of the United States Foreign Service and a former United States ambassador to Bulgaria and Indonesia.

Life
A member of Dartmouth College's Class of 1956, he was his class' 50th-year reunion honorary degree recipient, receiving a Doctor of Laws at the College's 236th Commencement Exercises on June 11, 2006. Barry also received a master's degree from Columbia University in 1962.

He was the United States ambassador to Indonesia from 1992 to 1995. He served as ambassador to Bulgaria from 1981 to 1984. He was the head of the US delegation to the Stockholm Conference on Disarmament in Europe from 1985 to 1987, the Deputy Director of the Voice of America from 1988 to 1990 and the Coordinator of US Assistance to Eastern Europe from 1990 to 1992. Following retirement he was the Head of Mission for the Organization for Security and Cooperation in Europe in Bosnia and Herzegovina from 1998 to 2001.

He lived in Rindge, New Hampshire.

References

External links
Nominations, October 23, 1981
Nomination of Robert L. Barry To Be United States Ambassador to Indonesia April 30, 1992
 Global Policies Lecture Series presents Robert L. Barry
txt files/2004bar Interview with Barry

Ambassadors of the United States to Indonesia
Ambassadors of the United States to Bulgaria
Living people
People from Rindge, New Hampshire
Columbia University alumni
Dartmouth College alumni
People from Pittsburgh
1934 births
United States Foreign Service personnel